There are multiple schools named Crest High School:

Crest High School (Kansas) in Colony, Kansas
Crest High School (North Carolina) in Boiling Springs, North Carolina